The Bohemian-Moravian Highlands ( or Vysočina) is a geomorphological macroregion and mountain range in the Czech Republic.

Location
This range roughly coincides with modern Vysočina Region.

Characteristics

The highlands form a big region of rolling hills and low mountains with heights between about 500 and 800 metres, whose lowlands are relatively densely settled. Its gentle hills are dotted with small farmsteads and also occasionally with holiday apartments and houses. The softly, rounded summits offer beautiful and stunning panoramic views of the surrounding countryside, valleys and castles to hikers and holidaymakers, as well as a variety of sporting facilities.

Division
Geomorphological division of the Bohemian-Moravian Highlands, including highest peaks:

External links

Bohemian-Moravian Highlands on AtlasČeska.cz

Mountain ranges of the Czech Republic
Bohemia
Moravia
Highlands
Bohemian Massif